Helmut Krieger (born 17 July 1958 in Sławięcice, Kędzierzyn-Koźle) is a male former track and field shot putter from Poland, who represented his native country at the 1988 Summer Olympics in Seoul, South Korea. He set his personal best (21.30 m) in the Men's shot put event in 1986.

International competitions

References
 

1958 births
Living people
Polish male shot putters
Olympic athletes of Poland
Athletes (track and field) at the 1988 Summer Olympics
World Athletics Championships athletes for Poland
People from Kędzierzyn-Koźle
Sportspeople from Opole Voivodeship
Polish people of German descent
Competitors at the 1986 Goodwill Games
20th-century Polish people
21st-century Polish people